Physocalymma is a monotypic genus of flowering plants belonging to the family Lythraceae. The only species is Physocalymma scaberrimum.

Its native range is Ecuador to Bolivia and Western Brazil.

References

Lythraceae
Lythraceae genera
Monotypic Myrtales genera